The Dar Es Salam Palace is a residence of the King of Morocco in Rabat, Morocco. It is specifically associated with the memory of Morocco's first king Mohammed V who appreciated its seclusion and made it a principal place of living. The palace was the venue of the meeting of North African leaders that was held when Mohammed V's son Hassan II succeeded his late father in 1961. It has also been used as the private residence of Hassan II's son and successor Mohammed VI.

A luxury Ritz-Carlton Hotel opened near the golf course in early 2023. The central campus of Morocco's General Directorate for Territorial Surveillance lies to the palace's immediate southwest, and its Temara interrogation centre a bit further west.

See also
 Royal Palace of Rabat
 List of Moroccan royal residences

Notes

Palaces in Morocco
Royal residences in Morocco
Buildings and structures in Rabat